Equestris (Latin for "mounted") may refer to:

Legio X Equestris, a Roman legion
Nyon, a town in Switzerland, called "Equestris" during Roman times